Allauddin Butt, better known as simply Allauddin 
(2 February 1920 – 13 May 1983) was a Pakistani actor who worked in Pakistani Lollywood movies. His film career spanned over 4 decades.

Early life and career
Allauddin  Butt was born in Rawalpindi, Punjab, British India in 1923. He was born into a Kashmiri family. Initially wanting to be a singer, and trained as a musician who frequented the likes of Ustad Alla Rakha in Bombay, the noted tabla player. Then he met the veteran producer/director A. R. Kardar in Bombay who was originally from Lahore. A. R. Kardar encouraged him to try the film world and introduced him to some film personalities. When Allauddin turned to acting, he was one of the very few Pakistani film actors who mostly acted as a villain, comedian and only sometimes as a lead actor in his films. Allauddin was the older brother and mentor of Pakistani film director Riaz Ahmad 'Raju' who was active in the Pakistani film industry in the 1960s, 1970s and 1980s.

Filmography
1940 Prem Nagar (Allauddin appeared in a minor role as a singer)
1941 Kurmai (A Punjabi-language film)
1942 Nai Duniya
1943 Sanjog
1948 Mela 
1951 Ghairat
1952 Bheegee Palkain
1953 Shehri Babu, Tarap
1954 Deevar, Raat Ki Baat and Mujrim
1955 Pattan, Paatay Khan, Mehfil and Khizan Ke Baad
1956 Dulla Bhatti, Peengan, Mirza Sahiban, Wehshi, Baghi
1957 Ishq-e-Laila, Raaz, Bara Aadmi, Sardar, Palkaan, Waada
1958 Lakhpati, Mukhra, Hasrat, Chhoomantar, Bharosa, Darbar, Aakhri Nishan
1959 Tairey Baghair, Neend, Jaidad, Jhoomer, Kartar Singh, Gulshan, Koel, Raaz
1960 Salma, Saheli, Dakoo Ki Larki, Rahguzar
1961 Mangol, Bara Bajay, Teen Phool, Farishta
1962 Shake Hand, Shaheed, Mehtab, Banjaran, Susral, Qaidi, Barsaat Mein, Azra
1963 Qanoon, Maa Ke Aansoo, Tees Mar Khan, Sameera
1964 Ishrat, Jhalak, Farangi, Ik Pardaisi Ik Mutiyar, Aurat Ka Pyar, Malang, Lai Lagg
1965 Had Haram, Phanney Khan, Chhoti Si Dunya, Tere Sheher Mein, Ik Si Chor, Zameen
1966 Mr. Allah Ditta, Insaan, Laddo, Badnaam,  Nizam Lohar, Naghma-e-Sehra, Kohinoor, Abba Ji, Janj, Sarhad, Un Parh
1967 Yaar Maar, Jigri Yaar, Yateem, Dil Da Jani, Chacha Ji, Elan
1968 Mehndi, Bau Ji, Chalbaaz, Ghar Pyara Ghar, Panj Darya, Chan Choudhvin Da, Jaggbeeti, Jumma Janj Naal, Janab-e-Aali, Maa Baap
1969 Choudhween Sadi, Yamla Jat, Zarqa
1970 Kousar, Anjan, Darinda, Sajjan Beli, Ali Baba Chalis Chor, Sayyan, Rangu Jat, Sajna Duur Daya
1971 Bazigar, Jalte Soraj ke Neeche, Yeh Aman, Sher Puttar, Sohna Puttar, Banda Bashar, Bazigar
1972 Umrao Jaan Ada, Ghairat Te Qanoon, Khalish, Insan Ik Tamasha, Yar Nibhande Yaarian, Do Rangeelay
1973 Anmol, Daaman aur Chingari, Sohna Veer, Ik Madari, Jithe Vagdi A Ravi
1974 Qatil Te Mafroor, Aina Aur Soorat, Harfan Moula, Namak Haram, Jawab Do, Laila Majnoo, Khanan Dey Khan Parohney, Nasha Jawani Da, Qismat, Dushman, Deedar, Shama
1975 Dhan Jigra Maa Da, Sultana Daku, Mera Naam Hai Mohabbat, Doghla, Be-Misaal
1976 Talash, Insan Aur Farishta, Deevar, Aurat Aik Paheli, Aulad, Waada, Sachai, Ankh Lari Badobadi, Zaroorat, Surayya Bhopali
1977 Kaaloo, Kora Kaghaz
1978 Amber, Inqalab, Puttar Phaney Khan Da
1979 Dubai Chalo
1980 Bandish, Behram Daku, Hanstey Aansoo, Farishta,
1981 Tangey Wali, Mohabbat Aur Majboori
1983 Aaj Ki Raat, Heera Aur Pathar, Wadda Khan
1985 Angara
1986 Yeh Adam, Baghi Sipahi
1990 Dushmani

Awards and recognition
 Nigar Awards for Best Supporting Actor (he received this award for 7 different years in his career) – 1957, 1958, 1959, 1960, 1963, 1968, 1980
 Nigar Award - Special Award from Nigar Awards, for Badnaam (1966 film)

Death
Allauddin died on 13 May 1983 at age 63.

References

External links
 

1920 births
1983 deaths
Indian male actors
Pakistani male film actors
Punjabi people
Male actors from Rawalpindi
Male actors in Urdu cinema
Nigar Award winners
20th-century Pakistani male actors